The Black Eyed Peas Experience is a music video game based on songs by The Black Eyed Peas. It developed by Ubisoft Quebec for the Wii and iNiS for the Xbox 360's Kinect, published by Ubisoft and released in November 2011.

Gameplay

Wii
The Wii version uses very similar style of play to the Just Dance series, in which players dance. The game uses a co-op scoring system. There are two modes of play in this version. The first is "Solo", where all players follow the choreographed routine by an on-screen member of The Black Eyed Peas. The second is "Duo", which is made for videos with two members of the group. Up to two players can dance as one of the two. In both modes, pictograms scroll from side to side (much like Just Dance 2).

Kinect
The gameplay of the Kinect version is different from the Wii version. This version has two players create their avatar with the Kinect. Once a song is selected, the player is shown a move that all members of The Black Eyed Peas are doing, and the player has to repeat it for a certain amount of time. The player is scored on how well they repeat the move. The process repeats with other moves. The choreography has three sets of three moves, with the last part of each set being a routine of three moves. The player can choose to do a full choreography, where the objective is to get a target amount of fans across two stages with the same choreography to clear the song.

Soundtrack
The game has a main soundtrack of 30 songs, all by the American musical group The Black Eyed Peas.

Downloadable content
There are 10 songs that are available for purchase on the Xbox Live Marketplace for 240 Microsoft Points each. These songs are not available on the Wii.

Reception

The Xbox 360 version received "average" reviews, while the Wii version received unfavorable reviews, according to the review aggregation website Metacritic. Many critics noted that the game was likely to be more enjoyable to fans of the group.

References

External links
 Official website
 
 

2011 video games
Black Eyed Peas
Cultural depictions of Filipino men
Cultural depictions of musicians
Dance video games
Just Dance (video game series)
Kinect games
Multiplayer and single-player video games
Music video games
Ubisoft games
Unreal Engine games
Video games developed in Canada
Video games developed in Japan
Video games with alternative versions
Wii games
Xbox 360 games